The 2003 All-Big 12 Conference football team consists of American football players chosen as All-Big 12 Conference players for the 2003 NCAA Division I-A football season.  The conference recognizes two official All-Big 12 selectors: (1) the Big 12 conference coaches selected separate offensive and defensive units and named first- and second-team players (the "Coaches" team); and (2) a panel of sports writers and broadcasters covering the Big 12 also selected offensive and defensive units and named first- and second-team players (the "Media" team).

Offensive selections

Quarterbacks
 Jason White, Oklahoma (Coaches-1; Media-1)
 B. J. Symons, Texas Tech (Coaches-2; Media-2)

Running backs
 Tatum Bell, Oklahoma State (Coaches-1; Media-1)
 Darren Sproles, Kansas State (Coaches-1; Media-1)
 Zack Abron, Missouri (Coaches-2; Media-2)
 Cedric Benson, Texas (Coaches-2; Media-2)

Centers
 Nick Leckey, Kansas State (Coaches-1; Media-1)
 Marwan Hage, Colorado (Media-2)

Guards
 Tillman Holloway, Texas (Coaches-1; Media-1)
 A.J. Ricker, Missouri (Coaches-1; Media-2)
 Ryan Lilja, Kansas State (Coaches-2; Media-2)
 Sam Mayes, Oklahoma State (Coaches-2; Media-2)
 Daniel Loper, Texas Tech (Coaches-2)

Tackles
 Jammal Brown, Oklahoma (Coaches-1; Media-1)
 Vince Carter, Oklahoma (Coaches-1; Media-2)
 Rob Droege, Missouri (Coaches-2; Media-1)
 Richie Incognito, Nebraska (Coaches-2; Media-1)

Tight ends
 Matt Herian, Nebraska (Coaches-1; Media-2)
 Mickey Peters, Texas Tech (Media-1)
 Billy Bajema, Oklahoma State (Coaches-2)

Receivers
 Rashaun Woods, Oklahoma State (Coaches-1; Media-1)
 Mark Clayton, Oklahoma (Coaches-1; Media-1)
 James Terry, Kansas State (Coaches-2; Media-2)
 Roy Williams, Texas (Coaches-2; Media-2)

Defensive selections

Defensive linemen
 Dan Cody, Oklahoma (Coaches-1; Media-1)
 Dusty Dvoracek, Oklahoma (Coaches-1; Media-1)
 Tommie Harris, Oklahoma (Coaches-1; Media-1)
 Greg Richmond, Oklahoma State (Coaches-1; Media-1)
 Marcus Tubbs, Texas (Coaches-1; Media-2)
 Adell Duckett, Texas Tech (Media-2)
 Gabe Nyenhuis, Colorado (Coaches-2)
 Andrew Shull, Kansas State (Coaches-2; Media-2)
 Justin Montgomery, Kansas State (Coaches-2)
 C.J. Mosley, Missouri (Coaches-2)
 Ryon Bingham, Nebraska (Coaches-2)
 Mineral Wells, Texas (Media-2)
 Rodrique Wright, Texas (Media-2)

Linebackers
 Josh Buhl, Kansas State (Coaches-1; Media-1)
 Teddy Lehman, Oklahoma (Coaches-1; Media-1)
 Derrick Johnson, Texas (Coaches-1; Media-1)
 Demorrio Williams, Nebraska (Coaches-2; Media-1)
 John Garrett, Baylor (Coaches-2)
 Bryan Hickman, Kansas State (Media-2)
 James Kinney, Missouri (Media-2)
 Barrett Ruud, Nebraska (Media-2)
 Gabe Toomey, Kansas (Media-2)

Defensive backs
 Josh Bullocks, Nebraska (Coaches-1; Media-1)
 Derrick Strait, Oklahoma (Coaches-1; Media-1)
 Darrent Williams, Oklahoma State (Coaches-1; Media-1)
 Nathan Vasher, Texas (Coaches-1; Media-1)
 Jaxson Appel, Texas A&M (Media-2)
 Ryan Aycock, Texas Tech (Coaches-2; Media-2)
 Medford Moorer, Colorado (Coaches-2)
 Donte Nicholson, Oklahoma (Media-2)
 Brodney Pool, Oklahoma (Coaches-2)
 Rashad Washington, Kansas State (Coaches-2; Media-2)

Special teams

Kickers
 Trey DiCarlo, Oklahoma (Coaches-1; Media-1)
 Luke Phillips, Oklahoma State (Coaches-2; Media-2)

Punters
 Kyle Larson, Nebraska (Coaches-1; Media-1)
 Cole Farden, Oklahoma State (Media-2)
 Daniel Sepulveda, Baylor (Coaches-2)

All-purpose / Return specialists
 Wes Welker, Texas Tech (Coaches-1; Media-1)
 Antonio Perkins, Oklahoma (Coaches-1; Media-2)
 Terrence Murphy, Texas A&M (Coaches-2)

Key
Bold = selected as a first-team player by both the coaches and media panel

Coaches = selected by Big 12 Conference coaches

Media = selected by a media panel

See also
2003 College Football All-America Team

References

All-Big 12 Conference
All-Big 12 Conference football teams